PSCO  may refer to:
Police Community Support Officer
Port State Control Officer
Public Service Company of Colorado (PSCo), a subsidiary of Xcel Energy